Archbishop's Garden (Hungarian:Érsekkert or colloquially Népkert) is a park in Eger, Hungary, that covers about 12 hectares.

History 
It was created on the area of a former hunting ground. The park walls were built by Bishop Esterházy. Some of these walls 
are still standing on the northern and western side of the park. The park was opened to the public in 1919.

Sights 
The fountain (built in 2000)
The sports facilities (football pitches, tennis courts)
The artificial lake with a bridge.

Parks in Hungary
Eger
Geography of Heves County
Tourist attractions in Heves County